Andrew William Tutte (born 21 September 1990) is an English professional footballer who plays as a midfielder for EFL League One club Bolton Wanderers, where he is also assistant coach of the club's B team. He has also played in the English Football League for Rochdale, Shrewsbury Town, Yeovil Town, Bury, and Morecambe.

Club career

Early career
Tutte was born in Huyton, Merseyside. He began his career at Manchester City since 1999, where he come through the ranks at City and was a star of the club's FA Youth Cup team. On 9 July 2010, Tutte signed a one-year contract extension to keep him at the club until next year. The club had announced that they decide to loan out Tutte next season to get first-team action.

Loan spells
A number of clubs interested signing Tutte availability, with a host of League One and League Two sides expressing an interest in landing the player on loan. However, Rochdale won the race to sign him on loan until January. He made his Rochdale debut on 21 August 2010 as a substitute for Joe Thompson in a League One game against Colchester United. On 28 August 2010 in a match against Brentford which Rochdale won 3–1, Tutte provided a double assist in a match for Anthony Elding and Jason Kennedy respectively. Tutte made his last appearance for the club as a substitute for Jason Kennedy in a 1–0 loss against Exeter City. After being recalled by his parents club, Tutte made 9 appearances for them.

Having been recalled Manchester City, Tutte made his appearance in the reserve for Manchester City where he played 90 minutes against clubs rival Manchester United in a 1–1 draw.

After the game, he soon went out on loan again to Shrewsbury Town with Tutte now set to drop down to League Two to link up with the Shrews on 25 November 2010 which was the deadline of loan and free transfers. Following the move, Tutte stated he wants to impress parent club Manchester City. After not being used for months at Shrewsbury Town but on 1 January 2011, Tutte finally made his debut against Burton Albion in a 0–0 draw where he played 90 minutes and played again 2 days later on 3 January 2011 when Shrewsbury lose to Crewe Alexandra 1–0 which was his last appearance before returning to his parent club.

After once again back at the club, Tutte joining Yeovil Town, again on-loan, until the end of the season on 1 February 2011. On 15 February 2011, Tutte made his debut for the club in a 2–0 loss against Peterborough United where he made his first start and played 90 minutes. At Yeovil, Tutte later became a regular starter for Yeovil. On 25 April 2011, Tutte scored his first professional league goal in a 2–2 draw against Peterborough, to prevent from Peterborough winning the game. On 30 April 2011, Tutte scored his second goal and provided assist for Andy Welsh in a 4–2 win over Colchester United. His last appearance for the club was against Carlisle United which they won 2–0 when he was a substitute for Ed Upson. At the end of the season, Yeovil Town expected to resign Tutte ahead of the 2011–12 season, which manager Terry Skiverton described his performance as "outstanding". However, Tutte move to Yeovil Town has collapsed, following talks with the player agent.

Rochdale
At the end of the 2010–11 season campaign, Manchester City released Andrew Tutte after his contract expired. After his release, three teams battled for his signature which were  his previous loan clubs. Also interested were Scunthorpe United. But on 24 June 2011, he signed a two-year deal at Rochdale along with Simon Hackney and beating them for Tutte. Tutte opted to move Rochdale because he swayed by the chance to work with new manager Steve Eyre again following their time together at City. Tutte said the club website on Eyre "I'm made up to be coming back at Spotland and back working with Steve, I cannot wait to meet the rest of the lads and get back in training. I really enjoyed my loan spell here, it was a very good learning experience for me and the club is certainly moving in the right direction and I would love to be a part of the team that goes one better than last season. Steve knows how to get the best out of me, there will be plenty of competition for places and that means you stay on top of your game. When you get the opportunity you have to be ready to take it and I'll be working hard to earn my place in the team." 6 months later, his time with Eyre ended when he was sacked with the club in 22nd place in League One. Unlike the previous loan spell, Tutte began to get more playing time with 40 appearances and scoring 1.

On 6 August 2011, Tutte made his re-debut for the club in a 2–0 loss against Sheffield Wednesday before coming off for Chris O'Grady which was last appearance before joining them. On 10 September 2011, Tutte provided assist for Ashley Grimes to score an opener in a 4–2 win over Bury. On 6 March 2012, Tutte provided assist for Jason Kennedy again to score the only goal for the club in a match against Carlisle which they lost 2–1. The next game on 10 March 2012, Tutte scored his first goal for Rochdale with a maiden strike in a 2–2 draw against Huddersfield Town. His goal was later a Goal of the season at Rochdale's end-of-season awards on Sunday night on 29 April 2012. Eventually, Tutte couldn't save Rochdale and was relegated after losing 2–1 against Chesterfield. After the 2011–12 season, The club revealed Tutte would remain as Rochdale player under contract for the next season. On 4 June 2013 Tutte further extended his Rochdale career when he signed a two-year contract.

In the 2012–13 season, Tutte scored his first goal of the season, in the first round of the League Cup, in a 4–3 loss against Barnsley. Meanwhile, in the league, he make a perfect start by scoring twice in four appearances despite picking up five points so far in the league. In October 2012, Tutte was nominated for September's Player of the Month awards. Unfortunately, Tutte would lose out to Port Vale's Tom Pope. From there, Tutte continued to be a regular in the first team despite change of management, with return of Keith Hill. Towards the end of the season, Tutte will miss the remainder of the season, with a knee problem. Tutte have previously suffered injuries in March. In Conclusion to the season, Tutte would make thirty appearances and scored seven. Tutte signed a new two-year deal with the club, having been offered a new deal in late-April.

In the 2013–14 season, Tutte started the season a very good start when he scored in a 2–2 draw against Chesterfield on 17 August 2013. Tutte then scored another on 28 November 2013, in a 3–1 win over Exeter City. However, Tutte had his first team opportunities limited once again by Manager Hill and released by the club on 23 January 2014.

Bury
Tutte joined Bury on a free transfer on 24 January 2014 after leaving Rochdale.

A week after signing for the club, Tutte made his debut on 1 February 2014, and played the full 90 minutes in a 1–0 win over Wycombe Wanderers. Tutte scored his first goal for the club on 18 April 2014, in a 4–0 win over Plymouth Argyle. At the end of the season, in which Tutte became a first team regular, Tutte had his contract extended when the club took up a retaining option.

In his second season at Bury, Tutte continued to be a regular in the first-team under the management of David Flitcroft and scored his first goal of the season in a FA Cup First Round 3–1 win over Hemel Hempstead Town on 8 November 2014. Tutte then scored two goals in two games, in a 2–2 draw against York City on 20 December 2014 and then in a 3–2 win over Northampton Town on 26 December 2014. Tutte scored his first goal in two months on 21 February 2015, in a 1–0 win over Hartlepool United. Two days after scoring against Hartlepool United, Tutte signed a two-year contract extension, keeping him until 2017. Manager Flitcroft expressed satisfaction at Tutte's decision to sign and believed the player would help make Bolton a better team. He was released by Bury at the end of the 2017–18 season.

Morecambe
Following his release by relegated Bury, Tutte signed for fellow League Two club Morecambe on 29 June 2018 on a two-year contract. Tutte was made available to find a new club in January 2020 due to limited first-team opportunities. Tutte was released in June 2020.

Bolton Wanderers
On 3 September 2020 Tutte signed for newly relegated League Two team Bolton Wanderers on a one-year contract after a successful trial and was assigned the number 18 shirt. He turned down League One team Accrington Stanley in order to sign for Bolton. His debut came on 12 September as he came on as a late substitute for Tom White in a 0–1 home defeat against Forest Green Rovers in Bolton's first EFL League Two match of the 2020–21 season.  On 28 May 2021 he signed a new one year contract. He was only able to play one match in the 2021–22 season, picking up an injury whilst playing for the reserves in September which caused him to miss the entire season. On 3 May 2022, the club confirmed that he would be released at the end of his contract. On 14 June however, it was announced he would remain at the club as a player/coach for Bolton's B team.

International career
Tutte has been part of the England set-up at under-20 level.

Career statistics

Honours

Manchester City
FA Youth Cup: 2007-08

Bury
Football League Two third-place promotion: 2014–15

England U19
UEFA European Under-19 Championship runner-up: 2009

Bolton Wanderers
EFL League Two third-place promotion: 2020–21

References

External links
Profile at the Morecambe F.C. website

1990 births
Living people
People from Huyton
Footballers from Merseyside
English footballers
England youth international footballers
Association football midfielders
Manchester City F.C. players
Rochdale A.F.C. players
Shrewsbury Town F.C. players
Yeovil Town F.C. players
Bury F.C. players
Morecambe F.C. players
Bolton Wanderers F.C. players
English Football League players
Bolton Wanderers F.C. non-playing staff